Alissa Czisny (born June 25, 1987) is an American former competitive figure skater. She is the 2010 Grand Prix Final champion, a two-time Skate Canada champion (2005, 2010), the 2011 Skate America champion, and a two-time U.S. national champion (2009, 2011). She is also the 2019 and the 2021 U.S. Professional Open Grand Champion.

Personal life 
Alissa Czisny was born together with a fraternal twin sister, Amber, on June 25, 1987, in Sylvania, Ohio. She is a summa cum laude graduate of Bowling Green State University where she was on a full academic scholarship while also competing at the international level and majored in international studies. She took some of her classes online due to her skating, training, and traveling schedule. Czisny is a vegetarian. She took ballet lessons from a young age to improve her flexibility and strength.

In August 2022, Czisny married retired Canadian figure skater Kurt Browning.

Career

Early career 
Czisny began skating at age 1½ when she and her sister, Amber, accompanied their mother to the ice skating rink because they did not want to stay at home with the babysitter. Czisny started skating in Bowling Green, Ohio, where Shelly Bressler was Czisny's first skating coach. Julianne Berlin became her coach in 1998. Czisny's first national medal came in 2001 where she finished 2nd in the junior event 

Czisny finished 4th in her Grand Prix debut at 2004 Skate America, to which she was invited after Michelle Kwan withdrew.

2005–06 season 
Czisny first gained international attention when she won the gold medal at the 2005 Skate Canada International and silver at the 2005 Skate America where she received a standing ovation for her free program. She qualified for the 2005–06 Grand Prix Final and placed sixth. Czisny went on to the 2006 U.S. Championships in St. Louis, where she finished seventh overall. She was one of four figure skaters featured on the 2006 TLC series, Ice Diaries.

2006–07 season 
Czisny began the season at the 2006 Skate Canada International where she placed fourth. She also competed at the 2006 Cup of Russia in November. At the 2007 U.S. Championships she was in fifth after the short program, but went on to win the free skate to win the bronze medal and the final U.S. spot to the 2007 World Championships in Tokyo, Japan. At the World Championships, she finished 15th.

2008–09 season 
Czisny finished third at the 2008 Skate Canada International in the 2008–09 Grand Prix series behind Joannie Rochette and Fumie Suguri. At the 2009 U.S. Championships, she won the short program by over five points. She finished third in the long program but won the gold medal due to her lead from the short. Czisny won her first national title, ahead of Rachael Flatt and Caroline Zhang. She earned her second trip to the Four Continents and the World Championships, in which she finished ninth and eleventh, respectively.

2009–10 season 
In the 2009–10 Grand Prix season, Czisny placed fourth at the 2009 Rostelecom Cup and won the silver medal at the 2009 Skate Canada International. Her short program score of 63.52 was the fourth highest of this ISU Grand Prix season, only surpassed by Yuna Kim (two scores) and Joannie Rochette. Czisny placed tenth at the 2010 U.S. Championships; as a result, she did not make the Olympic team and financial support to help cover her mid-five-figure training expenses was cut. She also found out her sister had cancer (in remission as of 2011). Czisny considered retiring but her mentors Brian Boitano and Linda Leaver encouraged her to continue.

In February 2010, she left coach Julianne Berlin, who had coached her for twelve years. In May, she said she would remain at the Detroit Skating Club in Bloomfield Hills, Michigan, with new coaches Yuka Sato and Jason Dungjen. She reworked her jump technique with the help of her new coaches, who also helped her with her mental approach. She noted, "I finally realized that my results in skating didn't define who I am as a person."

2010–11 season 
Czisny began the 2010–11 season by winning the 2010 Skate Canada International, her first gold medal on the Grand Prix series since winning 2005 Skate Canada. She also won Midwestern Sectionals, qualifying her to compete at US Nationals in 2011. She won bronze at her second Grand Prix event, 2010 Trophée Eric Bompard, which combined with her Skate Canada result qualified her for the Grand Prix Final.

At the 2010–11 Grand Prix Final, Czisny won the short program with 63.76 points and placed third in the long program with a new personal best of 116.99 points. She won her first Grand Prix Final title with a new personal best combined total of 180.75 points. At the 2011 U.S. Championships, Czisny placed second in the short program with 62.50, and then placed first in the free skate with 128.74, giving her a combined total of 191.24 to win the gold. She thus won her second national gold medal, finishing 7.86 points ahead of the defending champion Rachael Flatt. It was the first time since Michelle Kwan's ninth win in 2005 that a ladies' single skater won more than one U.S. national title. She placed fifth at the 2011 World Championships, her best ever result at the event. During the off-season, she skated in a number of shows. In 2011, she also made a brief appearance in a Super Bowl commercial for Chrysler and Detroit and starred in Chrysler's Perseverance video.

2011–12 season 
In the 2011–12 season, Czisny was assigned to 2011 Skate America and 2011 Trophée Eric Bompard as her Grand Prix events. She won the gold medal at Skate America and bronze at Trophee Bompard. She was first in the free program at Bompard with 121.90 points, setting a new personal best international free skate score. Czisny qualified for the Grand Prix Final. She sustained a calf injury during a practice session on December 8, explaining "it was the way I picked on a flip jump." After team doctors determined that she would not make the injury worse, Czisny went on to compete and finished 5th at the event. She won the silver medal at the 2012 U.S. Championships. After the 2012 Challenge Cup, where she took bronze, she decided not to include the double axel-triple toe combination in her program at Worlds. Falling twice in the short program and five times in the free skate, she placed 22nd overall at the 2012 World Championships.

Czisny was invited to the World Team Trophy but her coach Jason Dungjen declined and Gracie Gold was selected instead. In May 2012, an MRI revealed that Czisny had a torn labrum in her left hip. Czisny said she would not have competed at Worlds if she had known she was injured. After undergoing surgery on June 6, 2012, in Nashville, she began physical therapy the next day and after a month no longer needed crutches.

2012–13 season 
In the 2012–13 season, Czisny received an assignment to the NHK Trophy but withdrew in order to continue her recovery from surgery. She hoped to compete at the 2013 U.S. Championships. On January 12, 2013, at the 2013 Fox Cities Invitational in Appleton, Wisconsin, Czisny dislocated her left hip when she fell on a triple flip. She was taken to hospital where her hip was moved back into alignment. Her withdrawal from the U.S. Championships was confirmed when she had to undergo another hip surgery on her left hip.

In April 2013, Czisny resumed her regular training schedule at the Detroit Skating Club in Bloomfield Hills, Michigan.

2013–14 season 
In preparation for the 2013–14 season she skated two sessions per day, gradually increasing the difficulty of her jumps and spins and aiming to add a triple-triple jump combination to her long program. She worked regularly with an off-ice trainer and underwent physical therapy daily. With the goal of earning a spot on the 2014 U.S. Olympic team, Czisny made her comeback at the 2014 Eastern Great Lakes Regional Championships and won the gold medal with a total score of 145.12 after placing first in both segments. This qualified her for the Midwestern Sectionals in November but she withdrew and ended her season because she did not feel fully recovered.

Post-competitive career 
On June 19, 2014, Czisny decided to retire from competition, due to having had two consecutive surgeries on her left hip, saying she would continue to skate in shows and work as a coach. In June 2016, she underwent hip surgery for a third time, this time due to a torn labrum in her right hip.

Skating technique 
Unlike most skaters, Czisny spins and jumps clockwise. She is known for her excellent spins. She said, "When I was younger, my sister and I always practiced our spins together. We would spin for hours, seeing who could hold their spin longer and/or who could spin faster. We also tried to come up with as many variations as possible."

Programs

Competitive highlights 
GP: Grand Prix; JGP: Junior Grand Prix

Detailed results

References

External links

 
 Le cygne de Detroit - a poem in French by Vladislav Luchianov dedicated to Alissa Czisny
 

American female single skaters
Figure skating reality television participants
Bowling Green State University alumni
People from Sylvania, Ohio
American twins
1987 births
Living people
Twin sportspeople
Sportspeople from Ohio
People from Bowling Green, Ohio
21st-century American women